In computing, grist is the addition of characters before and/or after a parameter to ensure uniqueness to a software interpreter. For example, in a UNIX shell, if there is a file named "-f" in the current directory, the following command

> rm -f

will not work, because "-f" is interpreted as an option to the "rm" command. Rather, one needs to "add grist" to get the appropriate behavior:

> rm ./-f

In this case, "./" is grist because it prevents "-f" from being interpreted as an option.

In popular culture
In the series Homestuck by Andrew Hussie, a material called grist exists, and it is a fundamental material in the computer simulation-like world in which the work is set.

Computer programming